Kathleen Marie Higgins (born 1954) is an American Professor of Philosophy at the University of Texas at Austin where she has been teaching for over thirty years. She specializes in aesthetics, philosophy of music, nineteenth and twentieth-century continental philosophy, and philosophy of emotion.

Education and career

Higgins earned her B.A. in music from the University of Missouri–Kansas City and completed her graduate work in philosophy at Yale University, receiving her M.A., M.Phil, and Ph.D. Professor Higgins has taught at the University of California, Riverside, and she is a regular visiting professor at the University of Auckland. She has held appointments as Resident Scholar at the Rockefeller Foundation's Bellagio Study and Conference Center (1993), and as a Visiting Fellow of the Australian National University Philosophy Department and the Canberra School of Music (1997), and also of the Faculty of Psychology and Educational Sciences of KU Leuven (2013).  She received an Alumni Achievement Award from the Conservatory of Music at the University of Missouri–Kansas City (1999).

Philosophical work

Her work deals with the philosophy of Friedrich Nietzsche, the ethical aspects of music, musical universality, and the emotion of grief.  She has published over fifty articles on these topics as well as on beauty, kitsch, virtue, feminism, marketing environmentalism, Indian aesthetics, Chinese philosophy, musical emotion, synesthesia, television, death, and the philosophies of nineteenth-century philosopher Arthur Schopenhauer and contemporary philosophers Arthur C. Danto and her late husband Robert C. Solomon.

Her books have been translated into 10 languages: Chinese, Dutch, German, Japanese, Korean, Persian, Polish, Portuguese, Slovenian, and Spanish.

She taught a course for The Great Courses, alongside her late husband, entitled Will to Power: The Philosophy of Friedrich Nietzsche (1999). She also taught a course named World Philosophy (2001). This course is no longer available through The Great Courses, but all the lectures can be found on YouTube.

Works
 Nietzsche’s Zarathustra (Temple University Press, 1987; rev. ed. 2010), which was named one of the Outstanding Academic Books of 1988-1989 by Choice. 
 The Music of Our Lives (Temple University Press, 1991, new ed. 2011).
 Comic Relief: Nietzsche's “Gay Science” (New York: Oxford University Press, 2000).
A Short History of Philosophy, co-authored with Robert C. Solomon (New York:  Oxford University Press, 1996).
 

 "Arthur Schopenhauer," The Age of German Idealism, Routledge History of Philosophy, Volume VI, Routledge, New York, 1993, Chapter 10.
 The Music between Us: Is Music the Universal Language? (Chicago: Chicago University Press, 2012).

Co-edited
 
     (8th edition, Cengage Learning, 2009)
 
The Philosophy of (Erotic) Love, co-edited with Robert C. Solomon (Lawrence: University of Kansas Press, 1991). 
From Africa to Zen: An Invitation to World Philosophy, co-edited with Robert C. Solomon (Lanham, Maryland:  Rowman and Littlefield, 1993); second edition, 2003; Chinese translation, 2004.
The Cambridge Companion to Nietzsche, co-edited with Bernd Magnus (Cambridge:  Cambridge University Press, 1994). 
A Companion to Aesthetics, co-edited with Stephen Davies, Robert Hopkins, Robert Stecker, and David Cooper, 2nd ed. (Oxford: Wiley Blackwell, 2009).
Passion, Death, and Spirituality: The Philosophy of Robert C. Solomon, co-edited with David Sherman, Sophia Studies in Cross-Cultural Philosophy of Traditions and Cultures 1  (Dordrecht: Springer, 2012).

Textbooks
Thirteen Questions In Ethics, co-edited with Lee Bowie and Meredith Michaels (San Diego: Harcourt Brace Jovanovich, 1992;	Thirteen Questions in Ethics and Social Philosophy, 2nd edition (Fort Worth:  Harcourt Brace, 1998).
World Philosophy: A Text with Readings, co-edited with Robert C. 	Solomon  (New York:  McGraw-Hill, 1995).
Aesthetics in Perspective (edited) (Fort Worth: Harcourt Brace, 1996).
The Big Questions, co-authored with Robert C. Solomon, 8th ed.  (Belmont, Ca.: Wadsworth, 2010); 9th ed., 2014.
Introducing Philosophy, co-authored with Robert C. Solomon and Clancy Martin, 10th ed. (New York: Oxford University Press, 2012).

References

External links
Profile on University of Texas at Austin Website
Oxford University Press Author Page
Page on Great Courses Website 
Interview with 3:AM Magazine 
Nature 540, 9 (2016): "Post-Truth: A Guide for the Perplexed 
Blog of the APA: "Diversifying the Canon: Interview with Kathleen Higgins (2018)" 
Interview with "What Is It Like To Be A Philosopher?" Website (2020)
Interview on "The New Abnormal" Podcast (2022)

1954 births
20th-century American essayists
20th-century American historians
20th-century American philosophers
20th-century American women writers
20th-century educational theorists
20th-century American musicologists
21st-century American essayists
21st-century American historians
21st-century American philosophers
21st-century American women writers
21st-century educational theorists
21st-century American musicologists
American educational theorists
American ethicists
American historians of philosophy
American music critics
American music historians
American music theorists
American philosophy academics
American psychology writers
American social sciences writers
American spiritual writers
American textbook writers
American women essayists
American women historians
American women music critics
American women musicologists
American women philosophers
American writers about music
Academic staff of the Australian National University
Continental philosophers
Environmental philosophers
Environmental writers
Academic staff of KU Leuven
Living people
Nietzsche scholars
Philosophers of art
Philosophers of culture
Philosophers of education
Philosophers of love
Philosophers of psychology
Philosophers of religion
Philosophers of sexuality
Philosophers of social science
Philosophers of technology
Scholars of contemporary philosophy
Scholars of modern philosophy
Social philosophers
Theorists on Western civilization
Academic staff of the University of Auckland
University of California, Riverside faculty
University of Missouri–Kansas City alumni
University of Texas at Austin faculty
Virtue ethicists
Writers about activism and social change
Yale University alumni